A spanbaum ("wood shaving tree"), variously referred to in English as a hand-shaved tree, wood chip tree or span tree, is a handmade ornamental tree which is usually part of a pyramid ornament. They are mainly manufactured in woodturning workshops in the Ore Mountains of Saxony in eastern Germany. Their method of production is known locally as Spanbaumstechen.

Material 

The choice of material is especially important. Only lime wood with a straight grain is suitable.

Manufacture 
To make the spanbaum, first of all a conical blank of the tree is turned and a small disc is made for the base. The conical blank is clamped in a vice and the branches carved symmetrically using a chisel, shaving by shaving, on all sides.

External links 

 
 

Culture of the Ore Mountains
Woodcarving
Christmas decorations